is a 1953 Japanese drama film directed by Mikio Naruse. The film is based on the short story Ani imōto by Saisei Murō.

Plot
Mon, the elder daughter of a rural family, returns home from Tokyo pregnant after an affair with college student Kobata. Her parents fear a scandal that might threaten the marriage prospects of the younger sister San. Also, Mon, as the film suggests, supports San's education by prostitution, as the father's business had to close down and the mother hardly manages to finance the family by running a small store. The ill-tempered eldest brother Inokichi decides to take on the role of a disciplinarian, first beating up Kobata when he visits the family to apologise, and later Mon. Still, Mon forgives him and returns to the capital.

Cast
 Machiko Kyō as Mon
 Masayuki Mori as Inokichi
 Yoshiko Kuga as San
 Eiji Funakoshi as Kobata
 Kumeko Urabe as Riki, the mother
 Reizaburō Yamamoto as Akaza, the father

Reception
Film scholar Alexander Jacoby called Older Brother, Younger Sister an "uncharacteristically brutal film in which the emotional tensions […] explode into physical violence". Film historian Donald Richie objected that by "attempting to move from realism to naturalism, Naruse is occasionally at fault in manipulating his characters a bit too obviously". Keith Uhlich of Slant Magazine gave the film 3.5 of 4 stars for showing Naruse's "considerable skill at portraying household dynamics".

Literary source
First published in 1934, Saisei Murō's short story Ani imōto had won the Bungei Konwakai Award. It had been adapted for the screen the first time in 1936 by Sotoji Kimura and again in 1976 by Tadashi Imai. The story has been translated into English by Edward Seidensticker and is available in the anthology Modern Japanese Stories.

References

External links

1953 drama films
1953 films
Japanese black-and-white films
Japanese drama films
Films based on short fiction
Films directed by Mikio Naruse
Daiei Film films
Films scored by Ichirō Saitō
1950s Japanese films